Botan may refer to:

Places
 Botan River, a tributary of the Tigris River in southeastern Turkey
 Bohtan (Cizre Botan), a medieval Kurdish principality

People
 Botan Rojhilat (born 1961), Kurdish military commander of the Kurdistan Workers' Party (PKK)
 Supa Sirising (born 1945), Thai author, pen name Botan
 Shishiro Botan, Japanese virtual YouTuber associated with Hololive

Other uses
 Peony (Japanese and Thai: botan) 
 Botan Rice Candy, a brand of traditional rice-based Japanese candy
 Botan (programming library), a BSD-licensed crypto library written in C++
 Botan, the name of Kyou Fujibayashi's pet piglet in the visual novel Clannad
 Botan (YuYu Hakusho), a fictional character in the anime and manga series YuYu Hakusho

See also
 Bohtan Neo-Aramaic, a modern Eastern Neo-Aramaic language